Hirondelle (French) may refer to:

 Swallow (family of birds)

 Hirondelle (catamaran)
 Hirondelle News Agency, a news organisation based in Lausanne, Switzerland 
 Dassault Hirondelle, a French utility transport aircraft of the 1960s
 Western Hirondelle, a kit airplane
 Hirondelle, a GWR 3031 Class locomotive
 Operation Hirondelle, a French paratrooper raid during the First Indochina War
 Journal d'Hirondelle, a novel by Amélie Nothomb in which  the young girl is named Hirondelle

People with the surname
Anne Hirondelle (born 1944), American ceramist

See also
 Hirondel, a fictional car in The Saint books by Leslie Charteris